The Domesday Book of 1086 AD lists (in the following order) King William the Conqueror's tenants-in-chief in Derbyscire (Derbyshire), following the Norman Conquest of England:

 King William (c. 1028 - 1087), the first Norman King of England (after the Battle of Hastings in 1066 AD) and he was Duke of Normandy from 1035.
 Bishop of Chester (St John)
Abbey of Burton (St Mary & St Modwen)
Earl Hugh of Chester (c. 1047 - 1101) contributed 60 ships to the invasion of England, but did not fight at the Battle of Hastings.
 Roger de Poitou, his father Roger de Montgomery was one of William the Conqueror's main advisers.
Henry de Ferrers, served William the Conqueror and his successor King William II in administrative roles.
 William Peverel (c. 1040 - c. 1115), granted over a hundred manors in central England from the king, forming the Honour of Peverel, in Nottinghamshire and Derbyshire, including Nottingham Castle. He also built Peveril Castle at Castleton in Derbyshire.
Walter D'Aincourt, was connected by marriage to William the Conqueror and was awarded over 70 manors in the East Midlands and Yorkshire.
 Geoffrey Alselin
 Ralph son of Hubert (FitzHubert), (1045 - 1086), son of Hubert de Corcun (Derei).
 Ralph de Buron
 Hascoit Musard de Bretagne, served in the Breton section of William the Conqueror's army at the Battle of Hastings and was granted 25 manors in 6 English counties. He established his family estate at Staveley, Derbyshire.
Gilbert de Gant (Ghent), (c. 1048 - 1095), was related to William the Conqueror's wife.
Nigel de Stafford (1040 - ?), son of Robert de Stafford of Belvoir Castle.
Robert Curthose (c. 1051 - 1134), son of William the Conqueror and succeeded him as Duke of Normandy in 1087 AD.
Roger de Busli (c. 1038 - c. 1099), granted 86 manors in Nottinghamshire, 46 in Yorkshire, and others in Derbyshire, Lincolnshire, Leicestershire and Devon. They became the Honour of Blyth (later renamed the Honour of Tickhill).
 King's Thanes

Individual records of places in Derbyshire identify these additional tenants-in-chief:

 Dunning and Stenulf of Sutton, lands in Callow
 Edmund, lands in Lullington
 Ernwy of Stanton, lands in Clowne, Ingleby and Stanton-by-Bridge
 Healfdene of Cromwell, manor of Vlvritune
 Leofwin of Aston, lands in Coal Aston and Handley
 Osmund Benz, lands in Cellesdene, Cottons, Denby, Ilkeston, Osmaston and Sandiacre
 Toli of Sandiacre, lands in Ilkeston and Sandiacre
In the Domesday Book, Derbyshire was divided into the 6 wapentakes of Apultre, Hamestan, Littlechirch, Morlestan, Scarvedale, and Walecross, and a district called Peche-fers (Peak Forest).

See also 

History of Derbyshire
Hundreds of Derbyshire
Cheshire Domesday Book tenants-in-chief
Lancashire Domesday Book tenants-in-chief
Nottinghamshire Domesday Book tenants-in-chief

References 

Domesday Book tenants-in-chief
History of Derbyshire
Towns and villages of the Peak District
Former populated places in Derbyshire
Derbyshire-related lists